Shi Tao may refer to:

Shitao (1642–1707), Qing dynasty painter
Shi Tao (journalist) (born 1968), Chinese journalist known for his 10-year imprisonment
Shi Tao (cyclist) (born 1992), Chinese track cyclist